This is a list of the Romania national football team results from 2000 to 2019:

2000

2001

2002

2003

2004

2005

2006

2007

2008

2009

2010

2011

2012

2013

2014

2015

2016

2017

2018

2019

References

External links
EU-Football - international football match results of Romania 1922-present
Matches of Romania 
RSSSF archive of results 1922–2006
FIFA.com - Romania: Fixtures and Results
World Referee - Matches featuring Romania

Romania national football team results
2000s in Romania
2010s in Romania